Travel Guides is an Australian travel series which premiered on the Nine Network on 14 February 2017. The series follows groups of ordinary Australians who take on the job of travel critics who experience the same week-long international and domestic holidays, and review the same accommodation, cuisine, and local sights.

The series is based on a similar programme of the same name made by UK production company Studio Lambert in 2015.

In May 2017, the series was renewed for a second season. In October 2017, the series second season was officially confirmed at Nine's upfronts with three travel guide groups from the first season set to return. The second season premiered on 29 January 2018.

In March 2018, a casting call went out for new groups to become part of the third season for 2019. The third season premiered on 5 February 2019.

In October 2019, the series was officially renewed for a fourth season at Nine's upfronts. The fourth season was set to air in early 2020, however due to the COVID-19 pandemic, the season was delayed and aired on 26 January 2021.

In September 2021, the series was officially renewed for a fifth season at Nine's upfronts. The fifth season premiered on 30 March 2022.

Travel Guides, won the Logie Award for Most Popular Lifestyle Program in 2022

Travellers

Episodes

Series overview

Season 1 (2017)

Season 2 (2018)

Season 3 (2019)

Season 4 (2021)

Season 5 (2022)

Notes

International broadcast
In Israel, the show is broadcast on Arutz HaTiyulim via both yes and HOT subscription television services.

In New Zealand, the show is broadcast on TVNZ 2, and is available via the TVNZ OnDemand streaming platform. TVNZ also broadcast a local version of the show, Travel Guides NZ, which featured New Zealanders travelling domestically in 2021.

See also

 List of Australian television series
 List of programs broadcast by Nine Network

References

External links

2010s travel television series
2020s travel television series
Nine Network original programming
Australian non-fiction television series
Australian travel television series
2017 Australian television series debuts
English-language television shows
Travelogues
Australian television series based on British television series